Hubovo is a village and municipality in the Rimavská Sobota District of the Banská Bystrica Region of southern Slovakia.

History
In historical records, the village was first mentioned in 1235 (1323 Hubouu, 1449 Hubow, Hwba). It belonged to Gemer County.

Genealogical resources

The records for genealogical research are available at the state archive "Statny Archiv in Banska Bystrica, Slovakia"

 Roman Catholic church records (births/marriages/deaths): 1769-1896 (parish B)
 Lutheran church records (births/marriages/deaths): 1730-1895 (parish B)
 Reformated church records (births/marriages/deaths): 1770-1911 (parish A)

See also
 List of municipalities and towns in Slovakia

External links
https://web.archive.org/web/20071217080336/http://www.statistics.sk/mosmis/eng/run.html
http://www.hubovo.ou.sk/
http://www.e-obce.sk/obec/hubovo/hubovo.html
http://www.hubovo.gemer.org/
Surnames of living people in Hubovo

Villages and municipalities in Rimavská Sobota District